Yermek Bolatkhanuly Kuantayev (Ermek Bolathanūly Quantaev; born 13 October 1990) is a Kazakh football player who plays for FC Taraz as a defender, and the Kazakhstan.

Career statistics

Club

International

Statistics accurate as of match played 28 March 2015

References

1990 births
Living people
Kazakhstani footballers
Kazakhstan international footballers
Kazakhstan Premier League players
FC Tobol players
FC Kairat players
People from Kostanay
Association football defenders
FC Zhetysu players
FC Turan players
FC Taraz players